Lincoln Park in Los Angeles, California, was originally created by the City of Los Angeles in 1881 from land donated by John Strother Griffin. It was one of Los Angeles's first parks. It was originally called East Los Angeles Park, then Eastlake Park in 1901. On May 19, 1917, the park was renamed Lincoln Park after Lincoln High School.

Background

The park contains a large lake (Lincoln Park Lake, originally East Lake), a recreation center, a senior center, a playground, picnic tables, skatepark and ball fields.

The park is located at the intersection of Valley Boulevard and Mission Road and is served by Metro lines 76, 78, 79, and 378.

There was an earlier Lincoln Park in Los Angeles County, "just outside the city limits of Los Angeles and just inside the limits of South Pasadena."

References

External links

Parks in Los Angeles
Lincoln Heights, Los Angeles